This is a list of electoral results for the electoral district of Collingwood in Victorian state elections.

Members for Collingwood
The district initially had two members, which was increased to three from 1859, reverted to two after 1877, and was represented by only one member from 1904.

 = by-election

Election results

Elections in the 1950s

Elections in the 1940s

 Preferences were not distributed.

 Two candidate preferred vote was estimated.

Elections in the 1930s

 Two party preferred vote was estimated.

Elections in the 1920s

 Two candidate preferred vote was estimated.

Elections in the 1910s

References

Victoria (Australia) state electoral results by district